Stankovo may refer to:

 Stankovo, Slovenia, a hamlet near Brežice
 Stankovo, Croatia, a village near Jastrebarsko